Nelson Díaz Marmolejo (12 January 1942 – 4 December 2018) was a Uruguayan football defender who played for Uruguay in the 1966 FIFA World Cup. He also played for C.A. Peñarol.

Díaz died after suffering a heart attack on 4 December 2018, at the age of 76.

References

External links
FIFA profile

Statistics

1942 births
2018 deaths
Uruguayan footballers
Uruguay international footballers
Association football defenders
Uruguayan Primera División players
Categoría Primera A players
Montevideo Wanderers F.C. players
Peñarol players
Atlético Junior footballers
Millonarios F.C. players
C.S. Emelec footballers
Irapuato F.C. footballers
1966 FIFA World Cup players
Expatriate footballers in Colombia
Expatriate footballers in Ecuador
Expatriate footballers in Mexico